In the Shadow of the Moon is a 2019 American science fiction thriller film directed by Jim Mickle and written by Gregory Weidman and Geoff Tock. It stars Boyd Holbrook, Cleopatra Coleman, and Michael C. Hall. The film had its world premiere at Fantastic Fest on September 21, 2019. It was later released on September 27, 2019, by Netflix.

Plot
In 1988, several people simultaneously hemorrhage to death in Philadelphia, disintegrating their brains and causing massive blood loss. Police officer Thomas Lockhart and his partner, Maddox, investigate the case with Lockhart's brother-in-law, Detective Holt. Lockhart concludes that the deaths are connected when he finds similar puncture wounds on each victim. Lockhart and Maddox find an assault victim with the same wounds; she describes her assailant as a black woman with a wounded hand before dying. Lockhart and Maddox find the suspect and chase her into a subway, where she subdues Maddox. When Lockhart confronts her, the suspect reveals details about his life, including that his wife will give birth that day. She predicts her own death just prior to a struggle, which ends with a train striking and killing her. Although confused about the many unexplained details, the police close the case. Meanwhile, Lockhart's wife dies in childbirth.

Nine years later in 1997, an apparent copycat begins another killing spree.  Lockhart, now a detective caring for his young daughter Amy, can find no apparent motive or connection between the victims. Lockhart traces keys retrieved in 1988 to an aircraft manufactured in 1996.  Naveen Rao, a physicist, insists this is proof of time travel, but Maddox and Lockhart ignore him.  After tracking the copycat to an airfield, Lockhart is shocked to find the same suspect from 1988, who is alive and has not aged.  She unintentionally kills Maddox and takes Lockhart hostage, again revealing knowledge about his life she could not know.  After warning him off, she disappears.

In 2006, Lockhart is a private investigator obsessed with solving the case, which he now believes involves time travel and Dr. Rao, who has disappeared. The teenage Amy lives with Holt, and Lockhart maintains only occasional contact with her. Lockhart discovers a previously unrecorded victim from the 1988 murders and visits the victim's wife, who reveals her husband ran a white nationalist militia group. Lockhart meets Holt and advances the theory that the suspect is moving back in time as they are moving forward, killing each terrorist group members, but Holt dismisses the theory and insists Lockhart get psychiatric help.  Lockhart steals Holt's badge, uses it to impersonate a police officer, and tracks down the former girlfriend of the white nationalist leader, arriving at her home to find she has been murdered by the suspect. Lockhart chases the suspect and wounds her hand with a bullet before she disappears in a time machine. Lockhart is arrested by Holt as an unseen Rao watches.

In 2015, while waiting for the woman on the beach, Lockhart listens to a voice message from Amy asking him to come to the birth of her child. Suddenly, he is kidnapped by Rao. Rao admits to developing the technology the woman uses to kill her victims, an injection whose effects can be remotely triggered through time. He says he now believes her cause is justified, and that she is killing only those who inspired the perpetrators of a terrible tragedy.  Lockhart escapes from Rao and confronts the woman — who reveals herself as Rya, Amy's daughter and his granddaughter. 

Many years later, Lockhart convinces an adult Rya to take the mission after the militia group's terrorism triggered a new civil war in 2024, when she was only nine. Rya is traveling backwards in time, appearing every nine years in reverse chronological order, injecting her targets in the back of the neck with a remotely triggered isotope. From her perspective, the events of 2006 have yet to occur, and her hand is not yet wounded.  Overcome with guilt over causing his own granddaughter's death, Lockhart confesses that he killed her in 1988. Convinced that her cause is just, he lets her complete her mission. After Rya's departure into the past, an elderly Rao triggers the injections, killing Rya's targets and erasing the terrorist attack and subsequent civil war from the timeline. Back in 2015, Lockhart reunites with his family and embraces a chance at a new future with his granddaughter.

Cast

Production
The project was announced in February 2018, with Jim Mickle directing and Boyd Holbrook set to star in the lead role. The film would be produced and distributed by Netflix. In June 2018, Michael C. Hall joined the cast of the film. In July 2018, Cleopatra Coleman and Bokeem Woodbine joined the cast.

Speaking about the project, director Mickle declared:

Principal production commenced on July 2, 2018 and ended on August 27, 2018 in Toronto, Ontario, Canada.

Release
The film had its world premiere at Fantastic Fest on September 21, 2019. On September 27, 2019, the film was available to stream on Netflix.

Reception
The website's critical consensus reads, "In the Shadow of the Moon isn't always successful at balancing its assorted elements, but its struggles may be diverting enough to warrant a stream." On Metacritic, the film has a weighted average score of 48 out of 100, based on 9 critics, indicating "mixed or average reviews". High on Films website wrote "Certainly not on par with Jim Mickle’s previous directorial efforts".

References

External links
 
 
 

2019 films
2019 science fiction films
2019 thriller films
2010s mystery thriller films
2010s serial killer films
American mystery thriller films
American police detective films
American serial killer films
English-language Netflix original films
Fictional portrayals of the Philadelphia Police Department
Films about time travel
Films directed by Jim Mickle
Films set in 1988
Films set in 1997
Films set in 2006
Films set in 2015
Films set in 2024
Films set in Philadelphia
Films shot in Philadelphia
Films shot in Toronto
Temporal war fiction
2010s English-language films
2010s American films